Wojciech Wierzejski (born 6 September 1976 in Biała Podlaska) is a former Polish politician and former Member of the European Parliament (MEP) for Warsaw with the League of Polish Families, part of the Independence and Democracy group, and sits on the European Parliament's Committee on Constitutional Affairs.

Wierzejski was a substitute for the Committee on Culture and Education and a member of the Delegation for relations with Belarus.

One month before the 2006 Warsaw LGBT parade, he remarked: "If the deviants will start demonstrating, they need to be bashed with a thick stick." He specifically threatened German politicians who might join the march. These comments caused public focus in Poland and throughout Europe.

Education
 2000: Master of Philosophy and Sociology, University of Warsaw

Career
 2002–2004: Councillor and Vice-marshal of the Voivodship of Mazowsze

 2004: Treasurer of the League of Polish Families

See also
 2004 European Parliament election in Poland

External links

References

1976 births
Living people
People from Biała Podlaska
University of Warsaw alumni
Polish bloggers
Male bloggers
Polish Roman Catholics
League of Polish Families MEPs
MEPs for Poland 2004–2009